Korean Malaysian or Malaysian Korean may refer to:

 Malaysia–North Korea relations
 Malaysia–South Korea relations
 Koreans in Malaysia
 Malaysians in North Korea
 Malaysians in South Korea
 Multiracial people of mixed Malay and Korean descent